The Muslim conquest of Khorasan was the last phase of the heavy war between the Rashidun caliphate against the Sassanid Empire.

Background

In 642 the Sassanid Empire was nearly destroyed and almost all parts of Persia were conquered, except parts of Khorasan, which were still held by Sassanids. Khorasan was the second largest province of the Sassanid Empire. It stretched from what is now north-eastern Iran, Afghanistan and Turkmenistan. Its capital was Balkh, in present-day northern Afghanistan. In 651 after Yazdegerd III was murdered by Mahuy Suri, the marzban or administrator of Marw, Tabaristan was afterwards invaded by the Muslim Arabs.

During Rashidun and Umayyad era

Beginning of conquest

The mission of conquering Khurasan was assigned to Ahnaf ibn Qais and Abdullah ibn Aamir. Abdullah marched from Fars and took a short and less frequent route via Rayy. Ahnaf then marched north direct to Merv, in present Turkmenistan. Merv was the capital of Khurasan and here Yazdegerd III held his court. On hearing of the Muslim advance, Yazdegerd III left for Balkh. No resistance was offered at Merv, and the Muslims occupied the capital of Khurasan without a fight.

Second phase of conquest

Farrukhzad, the previously minister of Yazdegerd, and ruler of Tabaristan, managed to repel the Arabs with the aid of Gil Gavbara and make a treaty with them. The Arabs then invaded Khorasan, and made a treaty with the kanarang of Tus, Kanadbak. In the treaty Kanadbak agreed to surrender and assist Muslim forces while still remaining in control of his territories in Tus. Abdullah and Kanadbak then conquered Nishapur after defeating the Kanārangīyān family.

Last phase of conquest

A veteran military commander, Ahnaf ibn Qais, was appointed by Umar for the conquest of Khurasan, which in those time comprises most of present-day north eastern Iran, Afghanistan and Turkmenistan. On hearing of the Muslim advance, Yazdegerd III left for Balkh. No resistance was offered at Merv, and the Muslims occupied the capital of Khurasan without a fight. after that, for sometimes after Umar's death Ahnaf was re-appointed again by Abdullah Ibn Aamir for pacifying many revolting areas including Quzestan and Herat.

Reconquest

In 654, the Battle of Badghis occurred between the Karen family and their Hephthalite allies against the Rashidun Caliphate led by Abdullah ibn Aamir. this battle was completed the first phase of Rashidun Conquest in the soil of Iran. Despite initial Arab setbacks and the Turgesh invasion of Khurasan, Asad ibn Abdallah al-Qasri succeeded in inflicting a defeat upon the khagan in person in the Battle of Kharistan and turning back the Turgesh army. later after Asad's death a few months later, this success was instrumental in preserving Muslim rule in Central Asia, as the blow to the khagan 's prestige led to his murder soon thereafter and the collapse of Turgesh power. At the same time, Asad's conciliatory policy towards the native population laid the foundations for its eventual acceptance of Muslim rule and the Islamization of Central Asia.

In 724, immediately after the rise of Hisham ibn Abd al-Malik (r. 724–743) to the throne, Asad's brother Khalid al-Qasri was appointed to the important post of governor of Iraq, with responsibility over the entire Islamic East, which he held until 738. Khalid in turn named Asad as governor of Khurasan. The two brothers thus became, according to Patricia Crone, "among the most prominent men of the Marwanid period". Asad's arrival in Khurasan found the province in peril: his predecessor, Muslim ibn Sa'id al-Kilabi, had just attempted a campaign against Ferghana and suffered a major defeat, the so-called "Day of Thirst", at the hands of the Turgesh Turks and the Soghdian principalities of Transoxiana that had risen up against Muslim rule.

From the early days of the Muslim conquests, Arab armies were divided into regiments drawn from individual tribes or tribal confederations (butun or ‘asha‘ir). Despite the fact that many of these groupings were recent creations, created for reasons of military efficiency rather than any common ancestry, they soon developed a strong and distinct identity. by the beginning of the Umayyad period, this system progressed to the formation of ever-larger super-groupings, culminating in the two super-groups: the northern Arab Mudaris or Qaysis, and the south Arabs or "Yemenis" (Yaman), dominated by the Azd and Rabi'ah tribes. By the 8th century, this division had become firmly established across the Caliphate and was a source of constant internal instability, as the two groups formed in essence two rival political parties, jockeying for power and separated by a fierce hatred for each other. During Hisham ibn Abd al-Malik's reign, the Umayyad government appointed Mudaris as governors in Khurasan, except for Asad ibn Abdallah al-Qasri's tenure in 735–738. Nasr's appointment came four months after Asad's death. In the interim, the sources report variously that the province was run either by the Syrian general Ja'far ibn Hanzala al-Bahrani or by Asad's lieutenant Juday' al-Kirmani. At any rate, the sources agree that al-Kirmani stood at the time as the most prominent man in Khurasan and should have been the clear choice for governor. His Yemeni roots (he was the leader of the Azd in Khurasan), however, made him unpalatable to the Caliph.

Conquest under Umayyads

After the invasion of Persia under Rashidun was completed in five years and almost all of the Persian territories came under Arab control, it also inevitable created new problems for the caliphate. Pockets of tribal resistance continued for centuries in the Afghan territories. During the 7th century, Arab armies made their way into the region of Afghanistan from Khorasan. A second problem was as a corollary to the Muslim conquest of Persia, the Muslims became neighbors of the city states of Transoxiana. Although Transoxiana was included in the loosely defined "Turkestan" region, only the ruling elite of Transoxiana was partially of Turkic origins whereas the local population was mostly a diverse mix of local Iranian populations. As the Arabs reached Transoxiana following the conquest of the Sassanid Persian Empire, local Iranian-Turkic and Arab armies clashed over the control of Transoxiana's Silk Road cities. In particular, the Turgesh under the leadership of Suluk, and Khazars under Barjik clashed with their Arab neighbours in order to control this economically important region. Two notable Umayyad generals, Qutayba ibn Muslim and Nasr ibn Sayyar, were instrumental in the eventual conquest. In July 738, at the age of 74, Nasr was appointed as governor of Khurasan. Despite his age, he was widely respected both for his military record, his knowledge of the affairs of Khurasan and his abilities as a statesman. Julius Wellhausen wrote of him that "His age did not affect the freshness of his mind, as is testified not only by his deeds, but also by the verses in which he gave expression to his feelings till the very end of his life". However, in the climate of the times, his nomination owed more to his appropriate tribal affiliation than his personal qualities. The problems of Transoxiana could be resolved, although the Umayyad was on decline and being replaced by the Abbasid.

During Abbasid era

The widespread discontent with late Umayyad was exploited by Abu Muslim, who operated in the eastern province of Khurasan. This province was part of Iranian world that had been heavily colonised by Arab tribes following the Muslim conquest with the intent of replacing Umayyad dynasty which is proved to be successful under the sign of the Black Standard. Close to 10,000 soldiers were under Abu Muslim's command when the hostilities officially began in Merv.

Legacy

Further conquest

After the Abbasid took over the Khurasan, various new generation of Muslim Dynasty and vassal kingdoms was emerging and continued the second wave of Muslim conquest to the east. at first it was given by the Abbasid under the rule Authority of Saffarids, a Muslim Persianate dynasty from Sistan that ruled over parts of eastern Iran, Khorasan, Afghanistan and Balochistan from 861 to 1003. The dynasty, of Persian origin, was founded by Ya'qub bin Laith as-Saffar, a native of Sistan and a local ayyār, who worked as a coppersmith (ṣaffār) before becoming a warlord. He seized control of the Sistan region and began conquering most of Iran and Afghanistan, as well as parts of Pakistan, Tajikestan and Uzbekistan.

In 901, Amr Saffari was defeated at the battle of Balkh by the Persian Samanids, which reduced the Saffarid dynasty to a minor tributary in Sistan.

In 1002, after inheriting his father's army and territory, Mahmud of Ghazni invaded Sistan, dethroned Khalaf I and finally ended the Saffarid dynasty, thus forming his own suzerain empire, the Ghaznavid Empire thus marking the extension of Muslim conquests to the land of Afghanistan and India through his hand. establishing the second path of Muslim conquest to the far east after the conquest by Muhammad ibn Qasim on Sidh many decades earlier during the rule of Umayyad.

Diaspora

After the conquest, it is recorded that a massive migration of 50,000 Arab families from Basra to Khurasan. The region was considered the 'Second Arabia' or 'Colony of Basra'.

Du Huan, a Chinese travel writer captured at Talas, was brought to Baghdad and toured the caliphate. He observed that in Merv, Khurasan, Arabs and Persians lived in mixed concentrations.

See also
 Islamization of Iran
 History of Arabs in Afghanistan
 History of Iran
 Military history of Iran
 Abdullah ibn Aamir

Notes

Sources
 
 
 
 
 
 
 
 

Battles involving the Sasanian Empire
Battles involving the Rashidun Caliphate
Medieval Khorasan
Khorosan
650s conflicts
651